BTM Layout (an abbreviation of Byrasandra, Tavarekere and Madivala Layout) is a locality in Bengaluru, Karnataka, India.

Location
The area is around 45 km away from Kempegowda International Airport and 11 km away from the KSR Bengaluru. BTM Layout's proximity to Bengaluru Outer Ring Road, Koramangala, HSR Layout, Bannerghatta Road, J P Nagara and Jayanagara makes it one of the most popular residential and commercial places in Bengaluru. The 1st Stage of BTM Layout is separated from the 2nd-6th Stages, by the Outer Ring Road. BTM Layout is noted for its cafes, boutiques and music venues.

Economy
It is one of the high growth neighbourhoods in terms of property prices, showing an annual growth rate of close to 60% in early 2010.

Nearby tourist attractions include Bannerghatta National Park which is approximately 10  km away. Bannerghatta Butterfly Park which is located adjacent to the Bannerghatta National Park and is open on almost every day. The park is spread over an area of 7.5 acres with a butterfly trail of about a kilometer length. The ‘butterfly trail’ established over a five-acre garden leads the visitors to an innovatively designed three dome structure housing the conservatory, museum and the multi-media center Madiwala Lake which is home to rare bird species, is also famous in the neighborhood.

Also home to BTM Football Club (BTMFC) which plays A division football in Karnataka league.

References

Neighbourhoods in Bangalore